Thailand competed at the 1960 Summer Olympics in Rome, Italy. Twenty competitors, all men, took part in sixteen events in four sports.

Athletics

Boxing

Sailing

Shooting

Six shooters represented Thailand in 1960.

25 m pistol
 Prateep Polphantin
 Sumol Sumontame

50 m pistol
 Chalermsakdi Inswang
 Amorn Yuktanandana

50 m rifle, three positions
 Krisada Arunwong
 Saroj Silpikul

50 m rifle, prone
 Saroj Silpikul
 Krisada Arunwong

References

External links
Official Olympic Reports

Nations at the 1960 Summer Olympics
1960 Summer Olympics
1960 in Thai sport